MAWZ is the debut studio album by Argentine rapper and singer Lit Killah. It was released on August 19, 2021, through Warner Music Argentina and Warner Music Latina. The album began its production at the end of 2020 and was in charge of the Argentine producers Big One and Oniria and some songs by XAXO. The album has the participation of Argentine artists such as Khea, María Becerra, Duki, FMK, Rusherking and Tiago PZK. The album was very well received by fans and all of its songs are among the 200 most listened to songs on Spotify.

Background
At the end of 2020 Lit Killah had announced that he will be releasing his first album with plans to be released in mid-2021. After the success of the song Flexin' with the Argentine producer Bizarrap, Lit Killah announced that the recordings of his album were about to begin, the first single would be released until 2021.

Singles and promotion
The first single to be released was "Change" and it was released on February 18, 2021, in the song Lit he talks about everything he has achieved in his career from having very little to having almost everything, the song is dedicated to all people who met him doing freestyle. The song reached #64 on the Billboard Argentina Hot 100 chart. The second single to be released was "California" and it was released on June 17, 2021. In this song Lit Killah talks about a lot of glamor and a lot of jewels. The song reached #56 on the Billboard Argentina Hot 100 chart.

The third single to be released was "Déjame Tranki" featuring Argentine rapper and singer Khea, it was released on August 19, 2021, just hours after the album was released.

Track listing
All tracks was written by Lit Killah.

Personnel
Credits for MAWZ adapted from Genius.

Primary musicians
 Lit Killah – Primary artist, vocals
 Khea – featured vocals
 María Becerra – featured vocals
 Duki – featured vocals
 Rusherking – featured vocals
 FMK – featured vocals, songwriter
 Tiago PZK – featured vocals

Additional musicians
 El SideChain – bass guitar
 Germán Vidal Hahn – bass guitar
 Carla Agustina Nazarena López – choir
 Fabricio Ariel Siquie – choir
 Marina Lourdes Valor – choir
 Silvia Tatiana Rasgido – choir 
 Ezequiel Fernando Arias – guitar
 Ramiro Antonio Molina – guitar

Additional personnel
 Big One – producer, computer programmer, mastering, mixing 
 Oniria – producer
 XAXO – producer
 Juan Manuel Fornasari – executive producer
 Lautaro Palenque – general producer
 Carza – artwork
 Karen Salto – artwork

Charts

External links
 MAWZ at Apple Music

References

2019 debut albums
Warner Music Latina albums